The 1960–61 season was the 81st season of competitive football in England.  This season was a particularly historic one for domestic football in England, as Tottenham Hotspur became the first club in the twentieth century to "do the Double" by winning both the League and the FA Cup competitions in the same season. It also saw the first contesting of the Football League Cup.

Overview
Tottenham Hotspur sealed the First Division title with a 2–1 home win over Sheffield Wednesday on 17 April 1961. Preston North End, who had been the first team to achieve the League and FA Cup "double", was relegated in last place – and to date have not returned to the top flight of English football. 1960–61 still remains the last time Tottenham Hotspur won the League Championship.

Portsmouth became the first former English League champion to be relegated to the Third Division, ten years after winning their second title.

Peterborough United set a Football League record by scoring the most league goals (134) in a season.

FA Cup
Tottenham Hotspur beat Leicester City 2–0 to win the 1961 FA Cup Final at Wembley Stadium to become the first team in the 20th Century to win the double.

League Cup
The 1960–61 was the inaugural staging of the Football League Cup, The tournament was won by Aston Villa, who beat Rotherham United 3–2 on aggregate after extra time. Although Aston Villa are credited as the League Cup Winners in 1960–61, both legs of the Final were held over until after the commencement of the 1961–62 season due to fixture congestion. Villa finally lifted the trophy on 5 September 1961.

Transfers
In June 1961, Denis Law left Manchester City for Italian side Torino in a £100,000 deal – a record fee involving a British player.

Honours

Notes = Number in parentheses is the times that club has won that honour. * indicates new record for competition

Awards
Football Writers' Association
 Footballer of the Year – Danny Blanchflower (Tottenham Hotspur)

Football League

First Division
Tottenham Hotspur made history by becoming the first team this century to win the double, which in recent seasons had narrowly eluded the likes of Manchester United and Wolves.

Sheffield Wednesday finished runners-up, but an eight-point finishing divide between themselves and the champions meant that they never really looked like claiming the league title which had last been theirs in 1930. Wolves, Everton and defending champions Burnley completed the top five, while FA Cup runners-up Leicester City enjoyed a strong sixth-place finish and Manchester United finished seventh for the second season running.

Aston Villa's failure to mount a title challenge was compensated for by victory in the first-ever edition of the Football League Cup.

Preston North End performed dismally in their first season without retired winger Tom Finney, and went down in bottom place, joined in relegation by Newcastle United.

Second Division
Alf Ramsey's impressive Ipswich side reached the First Division for the first time in their history by winning the Second Division title – an impressive showing for a club who had been in non-league football 25 years earlier. They were joined in promotion by a more illustrious club in the shape of Sheffield United, who have been no strangers to the elite of English football. Liverpool just missed out on First Division football once again, while Norwich City achieved their best final position yet by finishing fourth.

Lincoln City went down in bottom place and were joined in the Third Division by Portsmouth, league champions just over a decade earlier.

Third Division
Bury won promotion to the Second Division as champions of the Third Division and were joined in the higher division by runners-up Walsall.

Chesterfield, Colchester United and Tranmere Rovers, who had all spent most or all of their history in nothing higher than the league's third tier, went down to the Fourth Division, but were relegated along with a Bradford City side who had played in the First Division for a number of seasons until 1922 and were FA Cup winners in 1911.

Fourth Division
Peterborough United enjoyed a blistering debut in the Football League, finding the net 134 times (with 52 goals coming from centre-forward Terry Bly) and clinching the Fourth Division title. They were joined in promotion by Crystal Palace, Northampton Town and Bradford Park Avenue.

Top goalscorers

First Division
Jimmy Greaves (Chelsea) – 41 goals

Second Division
Ray Crawford (Ipswich Town) – 39 goals

Third Division
Tony Richards (Walsall) – 36 goals

Fourth Division
Terry Bly (Peterborough United) – 52 goals

References

 

no:Engelsk 1. divisjon 1960–61